Nord 4.061 to 4.340 were a class of 2-8-0 tender goods locomotives of the Chemins de fer du Nord. At nationalisation on 1 January 1938 they all passed to the SNCF who renumbered them 2-140.A.1 to 2-140.A.280.

Origins 
Faced with increasing heavy goods trains, the Chemins de fer du Nord decided to replace the 3.078 to 3.354 series mixed traffic 4-6-0s (later SNCF 2-230.A) with more powerful locomotives: the 4.000 series 2-8-0s (later SNCF 2.140.A) and the 5.000 series 2-10-0s (later SNCF 2-150.A). Designed as heavy goods locomotives, the class gained the nickname of “les Bœufs” (“Oxen”).

The design used the same boiler as the Nord's first 4-6-2 Pacifics, the 3.1150 series; they had Belpaire fireboxes, a steam dome on the first boiler ring, and a sandbox on the second. The boiler has 90 Serve tubes, and a 24-element Schmidt superheater. They were fitted with Nord's variable exhaust. While they were delivered with vacuum brakes, they were all retro-fitted with Westinghouse air brakes, the compressor being sited on the left-hand side.

Thirty-five identical locomotives were built for the Nord-Belge, numbered 421 to 455, they passed to the SNCB as type 48, and were renumbered 4821 to 4855, and later renumbered again as 48.001 to 48.035. They had been built by John Cockerill et Cie between 1927 and 1931.

Construction history 
Construction of the locomotives was let out to various French manufacturers between 1912 and 1929.

Service history 
They were allocated to various Nord depots, including La Chapelle. They were used in coal train service between Lens and Le Bourget. During World War I, they were also used on troop trains, and after the war they were also used on passenger trains.

Several locomotives were refitted with Lemaître exhausts; this increased the power output by  due to reduced back-pressure.

Tenders 
During the course of the service, they were coupled to several different types of tender:
This short tender allowed the use of 18-metre turntables until 1925.
 22.A were rebuilt from the tenders of Pershing 2-8-0s.
 24.A (bogie) were also ex rebuilt from Pershing 2-8-0 tenders –  of water and ?? tonnes of coal.
 34.A (bogie) were former 31.A tenders modified to carry  of water and ?? tonnes of coal.
There were also occasionally attached to other tender types such as the 15.A, 23.A, 32.P, 37.A (from withdrawn Nord Atlantics 2.641 to 2.675) and 38.A.

Preservation 

Only 140.A.259 has been preserved, without its tender; it is in the collection of the Cité du train in Mulhouse. It is displayed on its side to evoke the acts of sabotage performed by railwaymen at the time of the Resistance.

Models 
An HO scale etched brass and white metal kit of the Nord 4.061-series is available from the British manufacturer DJH Model Loco.

An HO scale kit of the SNCB type 48 has been offered by Belgian manufacturer Jocadis, based on the DJH kit.

References 

Steam locomotives of France
4.061
2-8-0 locomotives
Railway locomotives introduced in 1912
Schneider locomotives
Franco-Belge locomotives
SACM locomotives
Standard gauge locomotives of France
1′D h4v locomotives
Freight locomotives